Edson Felipe da Cruz (born 1 July 1991) is a Brazilian professional footballer who currently plays for Saudi Arabian club Al-Adalah. Mainly a defensive midfielder, he can also play as a defender.

Club career
Born in Touros, Rio Grande do Norte, Edson graduated with ABC's youth setup. He made his professional debut on 28 August 2009, coming on as a second-half substitute in a 0–1 away loss against Figueirense for the Série B championship.

After being rarely used Edson joined Treze on 12 July 2012, on loan until the end of the year. He eventually returned to his parent club in January 2013, being regularly used during the campaign and scoring his first goal on 10 September, netting the first in a 4–2 home win against Sport.

On 11 December 2013 Edson rescinded with ABC, and signed for São Bernardo. On 25 April 2014 he was loaned to Série A club Fluminense until May 2015, with a buyout clause.

Edson made his debut in the main category of Brazilian football on 9 August 2014, replacing Bruno in the 64th minute of a 1–1 home draw against Coritiba. He scored his first goal in the division on 22 October 2014, netting the game's only in an away win against Santos.

Edson finished the season with 17 appearances and three goals, overtaking Edwin Valencia in the latter stages of the championship.

On 20 July 2022, Edson joined Saudi Arabian club Al-Adalah.

Honours 
Bahia
Copa do Nordeste: 2017

 Atlético Goianiense
Campeonato Goiano: 2022

References

External links

1991 births
Living people
Sportspeople from Rio Grande do Norte
Brazilian footballers
Brazilian expatriate footballers
Association football midfielders
Campeonato Brasileiro Série A players
Campeonato Brasileiro Série B players
Campeonato Brasileiro Série C players
Saudi Professional League players
ABC Futebol Clube players
Treze Futebol Clube players
São Bernardo Futebol Clube players
Fluminense FC players
Esporte Clube Bahia players
Associação Atlética Ponte Preta players
Atlético Clube Goianiense players
Al-Qadsiah FC players
Al-Adalah FC players
Expatriate footballers in Saudi Arabia
Brazilian expatriate sportspeople in Saudi Arabia